Annealing temperature may refer to:
Annealing (glass)
Annealing (metallurgy)
Polymerase chain reaction